Archibald Sharp (11 November 1889 – 26 June 1952) was a British swimmer. He competed in the men's 400 metre freestyle at the 1908 Summer Olympics.

References

External links
 

1889 births
1952 deaths
British male swimmers
Olympic swimmers of Great Britain
Swimmers at the 1908 Summer Olympics
Place of birth missing
British male freestyle swimmers